Kentucky Route 876 (KY 876) is a  state highway in the Richmond, Kentucky area. The western terminus of the route is at KY 595 southeast of Cottonburg. The eastern terminus is at U.S. Route 25 (US 25) and US 421 in Richmond.

Route description
The route starts at KY 595 (Kirksville Road) and heads east as the two-lane Barnes Mill Road. Just before it crosses Interstate 75 (I-75) at exit 87, KY 876 widens to four lanes and becomes the Eastern Kentucky University (EKU) Bypass (Eastern Bypass). Now in Richmond, the bypass turns to the east-southeast at KY 52 (Lancaster Avenue) before resuming an easterly progression at Boggs Lane. Past Boggs, the route makes a slight northward arc to its eastern terminus at US 25 and US 421. In previous years, KY 876 ran concurrently with US 25 and US 421 to the intersection with KY 52 east of Richmond.

History
Prior to the construction of the Dr. Robert R. Martin By-Pass, an extension of the Eastern By-Pass around eastern and northern Richmond, KY 876 ended at KY 52 (East Main Street). When the new By-Pass opened, US 25 and US 421 were routed onto the new northern bypass between KY 876 and I-75 exit 90, and KY 876 was truncated to the intersection with US 25/US 421.

Major intersections

References

External links

0876
0876
Richmond, Kentucky